Madeleine Haoua (born 20 March 1971) is a Cameroonian politician. She has been a member of the Senate of Cameroon since the 2013 election, representing the opposition Social Democratic Front.

Early life and professional career

Haoua was born in Ngaoubela in the Adamaoua region of Cameroon. She holds a degree in botany and ecology from the University of Yaounde and a PhD from the University of Ngaoundere. She was a teacher at various levels before entering politics. She also won a gold medal in handball in the Organisation du Sport Scolaire et Universitaire du Cameroun (OSSUC).

Senate career

Haoua is a Social Democratic Front activist who has been a member of the Senate since 2013.

References 

Living people
1971 births
21st-century Cameroonian women politicians
21st-century Cameroonian politicians
Members of the National Assembly (Cameroon)
People from Adamawa Region